Autochloris aroa is a moth of the subfamily Arctiinae. It was described by Schaus in 1894. It is found in Venezuela.

References

Arctiinae
Moths described in 1894
Moths of South America